Cross Lake may refer to:

Lakes
Canada
Cross Lake (Manitoba), a lake along the Nelson River in Manitoba
Ontario
Cross Lake (Temagami), in the municipality of Temagami, Nipissing District
Cross Lake (Moore Creek), in the municipality of South Algonquin, Nipissing District
Lake of the cross (Lac-Édouard), in Upper-Batiscanie, Québec
Lac Île-à-la-Crosse, in Saskatchewan

United States
Cross Lake (Shreveport, Louisiana)
Cross Lake (Maine)
Cross Lake, Wabasha County, Minnesota
Cross Lake, New York

Settlements
Cross Lake, Manitoba, Canada
Cross Lake, Ontario, Canada
Crosslake, Minnesota, United States
Île-à-la-Crosse, in Saskatchewan

See also
Cross Lake Provincial Park, Alberta, Canada
Cross Lake First Nation
Lac à la Croix (disambiguation)